Wagner Castropil (born 17 June 1966) is a Brazilian judoka. He competed in the men's middleweight event at the 1992 Summer Olympics.

References

1966 births
Living people
Brazilian male judoka
Olympic judoka of Brazil
Judoka at the 1992 Summer Olympics
Sportspeople from São Paulo